Susan Pevensie is a fictional character in C. S. Lewis's The Chronicles of Narnia series.  Susan is the elder sister and the second eldest Pevensie child. She appears in three of the seven books—as a child in The Lion, the Witch and the Wardrobe and Prince Caspian, and as an adult in The Horse and His Boy. She is also mentioned in The Voyage of the Dawn Treader and The Last Battle. During her reign at the Narnian capital of Cair Paravel, she is known as Queen Susan the Gentle or Queen Susan of the Horn. She was the only Pevensie that survived the train crash (because she was not on the train or at the station) on Earth which sent the others to Narnia after The Last Battle.

In Disney's live-action films, The Lion, the Witch and the Wardrobe (2005) and Prince Caspian (2008), Susan is portrayed by actress Anna Popplewell. Actress Sophie Winkleman portrays an older Susan at the end of the first film. In the book Susan is described as having black hair: "And Susan grew into a tall and gracious woman with black hair that fell almost to her feet and the kings of the countries beyond the sea began to send ambassadors asking for her hand in marriage. And she was called Susan the Gentle."

Fictional character biography

Prior story
Susan was born in 1928 and is 12 years old when she appears in The Lion, the Witch and the Wardrobe.  By The Last Battle, she is 21 years old, as the final novel takes place in 1949.

The Lion, the Witch and the Wardrobe
In The Lion, the Witch and the Wardrobe, Father Christmas gives Susan a bow with arrows that never miss their target, and a magical horn that brings aid when blown. Though her bow is magical, she practices to maintain her excellence at archery.

Susan and her brother Peter only discover Narnia after their younger siblings have already been there:  their sister Lucy has been there twice but was not believed, and Edmund reaches Narnia once at the same time as Lucy, but spitefully denies it to support the suggestion that she made it up.  But when the four attempt to avoid Mrs. Macready, the housekeeper of the large country house in Dorset in which they are staying during London's air raids, all four find the passage to Narnia at the back of the wardrobe they are hiding in.

Susan is advised to stay out of the battle. Together with her sister Lucy, she witnesses Aslan's death and resurrection on the Stone Table. After the battle, she is crowned as Queen of Narnia by Aslan, and shares the monarchy with her brothers Peter and Edmund  and her sister Lucy. She becomes known as Queen Susan the Gentle. The period of their reign is considered the Golden Age of Narnia.

Throughout the book, Susan is the voice of caution and common sense, but is often too concerned with physical comfort.  At the end, after a number of years in Narnia, she counsels against pursuing the White Stag, fearing the unknown transition she and her siblings sense that the pursuit might bring. Of all the Pevensies, Susan is the most content in positions of ease and comfort, and tends to advise the others to avoid anything unpleasant.

Prince Caspian
Susan's magical horn has become an ancient relic given to Prince Caspian by his tutor, the half-dwarf magician Doctor Cornelius. When the Prince's life is threatened by King Miraz the Usurper, Caspian blows the horn and the Pevensies are magically transferred to Narnia from a railway station in England. Using the bow and arrows she has retrieved from the ruin of Cair Paravel, Susan proves her legendary prowess at archery by defeating Trumpkin the dwarf in a friendly competition. She is described as being gentle and tender-hearted, and embarrassed to defeat the dwarf. Edmund, however, later describes her as "a wet blanket". She argues against Lucy's insistence in Aslan's presence, although she later admits to having known deep down that it was true.  Aslan tells Susan that she has "listened to fears", but his breath soon restores her faith, and she immerses herself in their adventures as deeply as in the first book.  She later accompanies Lucy as Aslan revives the forest and river spirits of Narnia. At the conclusion of Prince Caspian, Aslan says that Susan and Peter will never enter Narnia again because they have accomplished what they needed to there.

In the 2008 film adaptation, Susan is seen in a brief scene (newly added for the film) set in front of the Strand Underground station in London before the children are drawn into Narnia by magic. Susan encounters a boy who recognizes her and tries to chat her up. He comments that he has seen her before and that she often sits alone. She replies that she likes being alone, and when the boy asks her name she gives him the false name "Phyllis". In Narnia, Susan and Prince Caspian are attracted to one another, but this relationship leads to a bittersweet conclusion as Susan must return to Earth.  The film gives Susan a more active role during the battle scene at the end of the story.  She demonstrates herself a capable combatant, slashing Telmarines with her arrows between shots, as well as clubbing them with her bow.

The Voyage of the Dawn Treader
In The Voyage of the Dawn Treader, Susan accompanies her parents on a trip to America, while Peter is being tutored by Professor Digory Kirke.  Edmund and Lucy have to stay with their relatives, the Scrubbs. Susan is considered "the pretty one of the family", which makes Lucy insecure. Lucy is tempted to recite a spell she finds in Coriakin's magic book, which will make her beautiful "beyond the lot of mortals", and she pictures a plain-looking Susan jealous of her beauty - clearly hinting at a sibling rivalry not evident before. Susan is not very good at school work and acts old for her age (14 at the time).

The 2010 film adaptation shows Susan in a few brief scenes newly added for the film. She is seen at the beginning of the film writing a letter to Edmund and Lucy. Later in the film, Lucy steals the page with the beauty spell from Coriakin's book and at night recites the spell. Looking in the cabin's full-length mirror, she sees herself, grown-up and beautiful, in effect becoming Susan.  The mirror swings aside to reveal a society lawn party back in Lucy's world, and she steps through into the party to be joined by both Peter and Edmund, both of whom address her as "Susan". When she tries to remind them about Narnia, to her growing horror, neither of them seem to know what she's talking about or to know anything about a younger sister named Lucy. Lucy then wakes up in the ship's cabin and is confronted by Aslan about what she has done.  Aslan tells her not to judge herself by the standards of others, and reminds her that it was only through her actions that her siblings became aware of Narnia in the first place.

The Horse and His Boy
In The Horse and His Boy, set during the Pevensie siblings' reign in Narnia, Susan plays a minor part.  She is described as a gentle lady with black hair falling to her feet.  Shasta thinks her the most beautiful woman he has ever seen. Susan has become a motherly or sisterly figure to Prince Corin of Archenland following the death of his mother. She is asked to make a diplomatic marriage to the Calormene Prince Rabadash. She finds him gallant at tournaments in Narnia, but tyrannical and repellant on his home ground. The prince intends to hold her in Tashbaan by force; but her guarded rejection and subsequent escape from Calormen on The Splendor Hyaline with her brother Edmund and their entourage lead the Prince to rash action. He seeks the secret approval of his father, the Tisroc, for his plan to attack Archenland as a means of capturing Susan, and in the hope of subsequently conquering Narnia.

The Last Battle
In The Last Battle, Susan is conspicuous by her absence. Peter says that she is "no longer a friend of Narnia", and (in Jill Pole's words) "she's interested in nothing now-a-days except nylons and lipstick and invitations." Similarly, Eustace Scrubb quotes her as saying, "What wonderful memories you have! Fancy you still thinking about all those funny games we used to play when we were children," and Polly Plummer adds, "She wasted all her school time wanting to be the age she is now, and she'll waste all the rest of her life trying to stay that age. Her whole idea is to race on to the silliest time of one's life as quick as she can and then stop there as long as she can."  Thus, Susan does not enter the real Narnia with the others at the end of the series. It is left ambiguous whether Susan's absence is permanent, especially since Lewis stated elsewhere that:

C. S. Lewis further elaborated on Susan's fate in a 19 February 1960 letter to Pauline Bannister, who wrote to Lewis, upset that Susan was excluded from her brothers and sister from Aslan's country. He stated:

In his Companion to Narnia, Paul F. Ford writes at the end of the entry for Susan Pevensie that "Susan's is one of the most important Unfinished Tales of The Chronicles of Narnia", but adds in Footnote 1 for that entry:

Reviewer Barbara Wheatley wrote: "C.S. Lewis left to a whole generation of devoted fans an unsolved perplexing riddle - why did Susan have to be excluded and alienated from Narnia? It certainly serves no purpose in the plot of The Last Battle or of the Narnia Series as a whole. To my mind, there is a logical explanation – though admittedly, I found no quotation of Lewis to support it. The fate of Susan makes perfect sense when viewed as leaving the way open for a sequel. Susan needs to be separated from the others and become immersed in the mundane world so that she would grow up, get married and have children of her own, and it is they who would have a whole new series of adventures – presumably not in Narnia, whose story is most definitely concluded, but in some brand-new world. Unfortunately, if that was Lewis' aim, he never got around to writing that sequel, and we are all the poorer for it".

Criticism
Fantasy author Neil Gaiman's 2004 short story "The Problem of Susan" depicts its protagonist, Professor Hastings (who strongly resembles an adult version of Susan), dealing with the grief and trauma of her entire family's death in a train crash, as she is interviewed by a college literature student regarding her opinion on Susan's place in the Narnia books. Since the publication of Gaiman's story, "the problem of Susan" has become used more widely as a catchphrase for the literary and feminist investigation into Susan's treatment.

Authors J. K. Rowling and Philip Pullman, both of whom were influenced by Lewis, have also commented on the issue:

Portrayals
In the six-part 1960 BBC Home Service adaptation of The Lion, the Witch and the Wardrobe, Susan is played by Carol Marsh.
In the 1967 ITV serial, Susan was played by Zuleika Robson.
In the 1988–1997 BBC Radio 4 adaptations of the Narnia books, Abigail Docherty played Susan in The Lion, the Witch and the Wardrobe, Susie Hay played her in Prince Caspian and Deborah Berlin played the adult Queen Susan in The Horse and his Boy.
In the 1979 Warner Bros. TV movie adaptation, she is voiced by Susan Sokol.
In the 1988 BBC production, Susan is portrayed by Sophie Cook.
In the 2005 Disney film The Chronicles of Narnia: The Lion, the Witch and the Wardrobe, Susan is portrayed by British actress Anna Popplewell as a child and Sophie Winkleman as an adult.  Popplewell reprised the role in the 2008 film The Chronicles of Narnia: Prince Caspian.  Susan is portrayed as a warrior queen, whereas in the books it is stated that she did not care for battles. Susan is also attracted to Prince Caspian in the film, and gives him a kiss before she leaves Narnia; this had not been included in the book or the BBC adaptation. Popplewell again reprised the role in the 2010 film The Chronicles of Narnia: The Voyage of the Dawn Treader for two scenes: one, in which Susan is seen in America writing a letter to Edmund and Lucy, and another in which Lucy, by reciting a stolen spell, has literally become Susan.
In the 2005 audio dramatization, Focus on the Family Radio Theatre cast David Suchet's daughter Katherine as the young Susan, while Sally Ann Burnett played her as an adult.
In Epic Movie, a parody of Susan is played by Faune Chambers.

References

External links
 Chronicles of Narnia - Susan Pevensie. Analysis of the character Susan within the context of the series. Aimed for younger people.
 Christian response to criticisms of Lewis

The Chronicles of Narnia characters
Child characters in film
Child characters in literature
Female characters in literature
Female characters in film
Fictional archers
Literary characters introduced in 1950
Fictional English people
Fictional queens
Fictional women soldiers and warriors
Kings and Queens of Narnia
Fictional sole survivors